The first Nuestra Belleza México pageant was held at the Auditorio Benito Juárez of Zapopan, Jalisco, Mexico on November 13, 1994. Thirty-two contestants of the Mexican Republic competed for the national title, which was won by Luz María Zetina from Estado de México, who later competed at Miss Universe 1995 in Namibia. Zetina was crowned by Miss Universe 1994 Sushmita Sen from India and Lupita Jones, first Mexican Miss Universe and National Director of Nuestra Belleza México.

Results

Placements

Preliminary competition
The Preliminary Competition was held at the Auditorio Benito Juárez of Zapopan, Jalisco, Mexico on November 12, 1994. Prior to the final telecast, all contestants competed in swimsuit and evening gown during the preliminary competition, included corporal expression category and speech about their States. The Opening Number was a parade in State Costume.

In this night, were given three special awards to the contestants. The musical part was enlivened by groups: Café Tacvba, Magneto and Ángeles Ochoa.

The Preliminary Competition was hosted by Liza Echeverría and Marco Antonio Regil.

Contestants

Judges
They were the same judges at the Preliminary and Final Competition.
 Fernando Romo – Stylist
 Sara Castany- Editor
 Enrique Rocha – Actor
 Valéria Melo Péris – Miss Brazil 1994 and Nuestra Belleza Internacional 1994
 Ernesto Alonso – TV Producer
 Liliana Abud – Writer & Actress
 Sergio Bustamante – Artist
 Salma Hayek – Actress

References

External links
 Official Website

.México
1994 in Mexico
1994 beauty pageants